A by-election was held for the New South Wales Legislative Assembly electorate of Wollondilly on 12 November 1938 because of the death of  Mark Morton.

Dates

Result

Mark Morton died.

See also
Electoral results for the district of Wollondilly
List of New South Wales state by-elections

References

 

1938 elections in Australia
New South Wales state by-elections
1930s in New South Wales